Pope Eugene could refer to:
Pope Eugene I (654–657)
Pope Eugene II (824–827)
Pope Eugene III (1145–1153)
Pope Eugene IV (1431–1447)

Eugene